Arkady Dmitrievich Shvetsov (January 1892, Nizhniye Sergi, today's Sverdlovsk Oblast - 19 March 1953, Moscow) was a Soviet aircraft engine designer whose OKB was founded in Perm, USSR, in 1934, to produce the Wright Cyclone-derived Shvetsov M-25 engine. Under Shvetsov, his OKB became the primary provider of radial piston engines for Soviet aircraft industry (Mikulin's and Klimov's OKB were assigned to creation of in-line engines). After his death in 1953, the OKB was taken over by Pavel Soloviev.

References

1892 births
1953 deaths
Russian aerospace engineers
Heroes of Socialist Labour
Soviet aerospace engineers
People from Perm, Russia
Soviet inventors